Alexander Smith was a Scottish professional golfer. Smith placed seventh in the 1860 Open Championship.

Early life
Smith was born in Scotland circa 1840.

Golf career

1860 Open Championship
The 1860 Open Championship was a golf competition held at Prestwick Golf Club, in Ayrshire, Scotland. It is now regarded as the first Open Championship. Eight golfers contested the event, with Willie Park, Sr. winning the championship by 2 shots from Tom Morris, Sr. Smith finished in seventh place, scoring 196 in three rounds of play.

Death
Smith's date of death is unknown.

References

Scottish male golfers